Forres Academy is a comprehensive community school serving the town of Forres, Scotland, and its rural catchment area in west Moray. Similar to other Scottish schools pupils are able to leave after the fourth year of schooling, therefore fifth and sixth year are non compulsory.

Catchment area
The school serves the villages of Alves, Dallas, Dyke, Logie, Kinloss (including children of Army personnel) and Findhorn (including the nearby Findhorn Community)

Some students transfer from an area Rudolf Steiner school.

Location
The school is located next to Forres Swimming Pool and is also near to Applegrove Primary School and is a short walk from both the TESCO store for Forres and the high street.

References

External links

Secondary schools in Moray
Forres